Dumm Dumm Dumm is a 2001 Indian Tamil-language romantic comedy film co-written and directed by Azhagam Perumal and produced by director Mani Ratnam under his home studio, Madras Talkies. It stars R. Madhavan and Jyothika, with Vivek, Manivannan and Murali portraying other pivotal roles. The film featured cinematography by Ramji, editing by Sreekar Prasad and music composed by Karthik Raja.

Dumm Dumm Dumm opened on 13 April 2001 to positive reviews and went on to become a commercial hit.

Plot 
Ganga lives in a small village in Thenkasi district of Tamil Nadu and yet secures state second rank in XII board exams. Although she wishes to pursue civil engineering, her father Veluthambi plans to get her married to young Lawyer Adhithya aka Adhi, who also hails from the same village. The reason for this alliance is that Adhi's rich dad was Veluthambi's former boss who helped him become a rich rice mill owner, and Velu wants to repay the moral debt. Adhi is a fun-loving person who has just completed his law degree and prefers to enjoy his bachelor life and is not interested in marriage.

Adhi comes to the village and meets Ganga trying to convey his feelings. To his surprise, Ganga is also not interested in marriage as she wants to study in Chennai. Both of them decide to somehow stop the wedding by creating some problem before the wedding, but all their efforts go in vain as both the families get even closer following their plans.

Slowly, Adhi and Ganga start liking each other and decide to get married. However, to their shock, on the day before the wedding, a small quarrel erupts between Veluthambi and Adhi's father while playing cards. Adhi's father accuses Veluthambi of cheating during the game, which was actually done by Adhi's relative Dr Kathamuthu. Veluthambi retaliates to prove his genuineness. The argument, which started in a funnier tone, gets serious slowly, and immediately, both of the families decide to get the wedding cancelled and in the tussle, Adhi's house servant is stabbed. Ganga's brother-in-law, a government school PT teacher, is blamed for the incident and is arrested.

Ganga is sent to Chennai to pursue engineering and stays with her paternal uncle Sivaji, who is a leading lawyer by profession. Adhi, who also lives in Chennai, meets Ganga, and they both now plan to get the cancelled wedding re-arranged again by their families. Adhi comes in place of his friend Jim as a junior lawyer to assist Sivaji, thereby meeting Ganga every day. Sivaji finds that Adhi has not come as a junior and instead for some other reason. However, he misunderstands that Adhi is in love with his own daughter and fears that his daughter might elope with Adhi someday. Adhi appears as lawyer for Veluthambi's son-in-law, and saves him based on lack of evidence.

Finally, Adhi's father understands that Veluthambi was innocent and apologizes to him. Adhi and Ganga are united in the end.

Cast 

 R. Madhavan as Adhitya aka Aadhi
 Jyothika as Ganga Veluthambi
 Manivannan as Sivaji
 Vivek as Jim
 Murali as Veluthambi, Ganga's father
 V. K. Ramasamy as Ganga's grandfather
 Delhi Kumar as Adhi's father
 Kalairani as Adhi's mother
 Chinni Jayanth as Sivaji's client
 Gowtham Sundararajan as Ganga's brother-in-law
 M. S. Bhaskar as Adhi's relative
 Kalpana as Pattamma
 Richa Ahuja as Asha
 Vaiyapuri as Saami
 Sridhar as Shree
 Shanthi Williams as Sivaji's wife
S. N. Parvathy as Ganga's grandmother
Preetha as Sivaji's daughter

Production 
Mani Ratnam chose his assistant Azhagam Perumal to direct a film for his production studio, Madras Talkies in late 2000 and the pair worked on a screenplay together. Azhagam Perumal had earlier begun two projects, Mudhal Mudhalaaga in 1998 and Udhaya in 1998, but both films ran into production troubles, so his mentor Mani Ratnam was keen to launch him as a director. The basic plotline of the film was taken from the episode Love Story from Suhasini's 1991 miniseries Penn. While Mani Ratnam worked on writing the film's city portions, Azhagam Perumal wrote the portions set in the village. R. Madhavan, who played the lead role in Mani Ratnam's previous project Alaipayuthey (2000), was signed on to play the lead role alongside actress Jyothika. It was initially reported that Madras Talkies had signed on composer Dhina to work on the film's soundtrack, but he was later replaced by Karthik Raja.

A song sequence was shot at Thanjavur Periya Koil and became the final film to shoot there until Kandaen released in 2011. The film had a premiere on 13 April 2001 at Sathyam Cinemas in aid of the Ability Foundation, an organisation working for the welfare of the disabled.

Release 
Upon release on 13 April 2001, Dumm Dumm Dumm garnered predominantly positive feedback from critics. The critic from Rediff.com cited that the film "has what it takes to come up with a box office bonanza" and said that "the real star, though, is director Azhagam Perumal." Furthermore, the reviewer praised R. Madhavan and Jyothika, the lead pair, as  "perfectly cast, and perform as per expectations," whilst labeling that Murali delivered a "measured performance." The Hindu'''s verdict was that the film was "a neat entertainer that seems to lose focus on and off," whilst drawing particular praise for the performance of the leading actors. New Straits Times wrote "Dumm Dumm Dumm is a surprisingly good effort from a new director and one suspects Maniratnam had a close hand in guiding him". Likewise, a reviewer from Screen noted "Azhagam Perumal has shown a good grasp of the medium and the ability to finely blend the rustic charm and city slickness in a love story extracting fine performance from the lead pair, Madhavan and Jyothika."

The film went on to become a commercially successful venture at the box office. Subsequently, the film was later dubbed and released in Telugu as Dum Dum Dum''. It subsequently was awarded with several Cinema Express Awards and was the most awarded film at the award function with Karthik Raja winning Best Tamil Music Director Award for his work.

Soundtrack 

The soundtrack features six songs composed by Karthik Raja. The lyrics were penned by Vaali, Pa. Vijay and Na. Muthukumar.

References

External links 
 

2001 films
Films about Indian weddings
2000s Tamil-language films
Indian romantic comedy films
2001 directorial debut films
2001 romantic comedy films
Films scored by Karthik Raja